Gol-e-Afroze Government College, also called Gule Afroze Degree College, is the only public residential, coeducational, institute of higher learning of Singra in Natore, Bangladesh. It is one of the five government colleges in the Natore District, and the third oldest, established before the War of 1971 and the Independence of the country. Although it was a private college of the aristocratic Singranatore family, in 1986, the then President and former military ruler, HM Ershad announced that it would be made into a public college. Since then it is under the Ministry of Education of the Government of Bangladesh.

History

It is named after Begum Gole Afroz, a member of the Singranatore family of Rajshahi, the daughter of Gulbadan Begum of Natore and Shamezuddin Ahmed. She was a granddaughter of Mirza Jalaluddin, the last zamindar of Natore and the wife of MM Rahmatullah.

Gallery

Further reading
Prothista Porichiti: Gole Afroz Shorkari Degree College 1996.

References

External links

 Official Website Gole Afroz Government College
 Official Website Bangladesh Bureau of Educational Information and Statistics
 Official Website Ministry of Education

Colleges in Natore District
Educational institutions established in 1970
Natore District